General elections were held in Turkey on 14 October 1973. The Republican People's Party (CHP) emerged as the largest party, winning 185 of the 450 seats with 33% of the vote. The Justice Party (AP) led by Süleyman Demirel, which had won a majority in the previous elections in 1969, lost over a third of its seats, winning just 149. This was a result of two new parties, the National Salvation Party and the Democratic Party, splitting the right-wing vote.

The CHP formed a government with the religious-oriented National Salvation Party on 26 January 1974. However, the government lasted only ten months before its fall.

Results
Voter turnout was 66.8%.

References

External links
, Brief explanation of the results

General elections in Turkey
General
Turkey
Turkey